A list of films produced in France in 1966.

See also
 1966 in France

References

Footnotes

Sources

External links
 French films of 1966 at the Internet Movie Database
French films of 1966 at Cinema-francais.fr

1966
Films
French